This article provides details of international football games played by the Bangladesh women's national football team from 2020 to present.

Results

2022

2021

References

Bangladesh women's national football team results
2020s in Bangladeshi sport